Karen Attiah (born August 12, 1986) is an American writer and editor. She serves as Global Opinions editor for The Washington Post. With David Ignatius, Attiah won a 2019 George Polk Award for their writing about the murder of their colleague Jamal Khashoggi. She was also named 2019 Journalist of the Year Award by the National Association of Black Journalists for her coverage of Khashoggi's murder.

Early life 
Attiah was born in 1986 in North Central Texas to a Nigerian-Ghanaian mother and Ghanaian father. Her father was a pulmonologist. After graduation from Northwestern University with a degree in communication studies and a minor in African studies, Attiah won a Fulbright Scholarship to study in Accra, Ghana, and obtained an MA in international affairs in 2012 from Columbia University's School of International and Public Affairs.

Career 
After graduate school, Attiah freelanced for the Associated Press from Curaçao. In 2014, she joined the Washington Post. Attiah became the focus of international attention in October 2018 when a columnist she had recruited for the Washington Posts "Global Opinions" section, Saudi writer Jamal Khashoggi, went missing on 2 October 2018 after entering the Saudi embassy in Istanbul. In an interview in Marie Claire, Attiah said her WhatsApp was suddenly flooded with "Jamal's missing" messages, and she felt she knew the worst had happened. On October 5, two days after his disappearance, Attiah let his column space remain blank with the title "A missing voice" and her tweet with the empty space was retweeted by Christiane Amanpour and 1,206 others. Since then she has been interviewed by major news outlets as the primary contact for Khashoggi's last published opinion, and she began writing about his death and advocating for investigation. In 2019, she received a number of awards for her efforts. She and David Ignatius won a George Polk Award for their writing about Khashoggi's murder. Attiah was also named 2019 Journalist of the Year Award by the National Association of Black Journalists, recognized for "raising her voice and using the power of her pen to bring attention to and offer ongoing coverage" of Khashoggi's murder. She was named to the 2019 Root 100 list, cited as "an evangelist for racial equity and justice and [...] a champion for columnist Jamal Khashoggi, whose assassination exposed violence against the press."

Attiah is writing a book about Khashoggi called Say Your Word, Then Leave, due out in 2022.

In July 2019, Attiah accused Nancy Pelosi, the Speaker of the United States House of Representatives, of making dog whistling attacks against Alexandria Ocasio-Cortez, Ilhan Omar, Rashida Tlaib and Ayanna Pressley, and asserting that it has helped to fuel President Donald Trump's rhetoric.

In November 2020, Attiah tweeted inaccurately about pending French legislation, wrongly accusing French President Emmanuel Macron of planning to "give Muslim's kids ID numbers to go to schools." Attiah later deleted her tweet and apologized to her colleagues, though not to Macron.

References

External links
 Wordpress blog kept by Karen Attiah 
 18-Oct-2018 interview of Attiah in New York Times

Living people
American women journalists
American people of Nigerian descent
American people of Ghanaian descent
School of International and Public Affairs, Columbia University alumni
Northwestern University alumni
21st-century American women
Fulbright alumni
1986 births